The Blue Lake Rancheria of the Wiyot, Yurok, and Hupa Indians is located northwest of the city of Blue Lake in Humboldt County, California on approximately . As of 2007, there were 53 enrolled members.  As of the 2010 Census the population of Blue Lake Rancheria was 58.

History

An approximately  area, named the Blue Lake Rancheria was set up by Executive Order on December 24, 1908 to provide a refuge for otherwise homeless native people, but the Rancheria was terminated in 1954 by the Federal Government.

In 1966, the United States Government returned the Blue Lake Rancheria to the tribe and removed all Native rights from the tribe's citizens.

A class action lawsuit, Tillie Hardwick v. United States of America, was won in 1983 by 17 Rancherias including Blue Lake Rancheria; the federal government was ordered to reinstate federal recognition for all the plaintiffs.   These rights were returned in 1989 and the tribe now operates under their own constitution.

In January 2008, the Blue Lake Rancheria Tribal Court was established to adjudicate both civil and criminal matters  inside the reservation.

The area has a 55,000-square-foot casino and 102 hotel rooms. After the 2011 Tōhoku earthquake and tsunami caused local panic and confusion among travellers (but little damage), the complex installed 420 kW solar panels, grid batteries and backup generators to retain electricity after expected storms, wildfires and earthquakes, and supply the grid during peak demand.

Education
The ranchería is served by the Blue Lake Union Elementary School District and Northern Humboldt Union High School District.

Enrollment
The requirement to enroll into the Blue Lake Rancheria is lineal descent, which means that there is no restriction on blood quantum.

See also
 List of Indian reservations in the United States

References

External links
 
 Abate, Tom, The Little Casino That Could?, North Coast Journal, February 10, 2011

Hupa
Tolowa
Yurok
Federally recognized tribes in the United States
Native American tribes in California
American Indian reservations in California
Native Americans in Humboldt County, California
Blue Lake, California